United States national soccer team may refer to:

United States men's national soccer team, men's national association football team
United States women's national soccer team, women's national association football team

See also
United States national under-23 soccer team
United States national under-20 soccer team
United States national under-17 soccer team